Chimdi Chekwa (born October 7, 1988) is a former American football cornerback. He played college football at Ohio State. He was drafted by the Raiders in the fourth round in the 2011 NFL Draft.

College career
As a senior in 2010, Chekwa was named a first-team All-American by the FWAA and College Football News.

Professional career

Oakland Raiders
Chekwa was drafted by the Oakland Raiders in the fourth round, 113th overall, in the 2011 NFL Draft.

New England Patriots
He was signed by the New England Patriots on March 12, 2015. He was released by the team on May 18, 2015.

Oakland Raiders (second stint)
Chekwa re-signed with the Raiders on May 19, 2015.

Miami Dolphins
Chekwa signed with the Dolphins. On September 3, 2016, he was released as part of final roster cuts. He was re-signed by the Dolphins on October 11, 2016. He was released by the Dolphins on November 7, 2016.

Personal life
In 2016, Chekwa earned a Master of Business Administration degree from the University of Miami Business School.

References

External links
 Oakland Raiders bio
Ohio State Buckeyes bio

1988 births
Living people
People from Clermont, Florida
Players of American football from Florida
Sportspeople from Lake County, Florida
American sportspeople of Nigerian descent
American football cornerbacks
Ohio State Buckeyes football players
Oakland Raiders players
New England Patriots players
Miami Dolphins players
People from Marrero, Louisiana
University of Miami Business School alumni